She Walks These Hills is a 1994 book written by Sharyn McCrumb and published by Charles Scribner's Sons, which later went on to win the Anthony Award for Best Novel in 1995.

References 

Anthony Award-winning works
American mystery novels
1994 American novels